Pseudoterpna corsicaria is a moth of the family Geometridae first described by Jules Pierre Rambur in 1833. It is found on Corsica and Sardinia.

The wingspan is 28–29 mm.

References

External links

Lepiforum e.V.

Moths described in 1833
Pseudoterpnini
Moths of Europe
Taxa named by Jules Pierre Rambur